The name Red FM refers to more than one radio station:

 Red FM (Australia), a commercial radio network covering the remote areas of Western Australia
 Red FM (India) (93.5 MHz), an Indian radio brand with stations broadcasting at 93.5 MHz across the country
 Red FM (Ireland) ILR (104.5-106.1 MHz), an Irish radio station which broadcasts to Cork and the surrounding area
 CKYE-FM (93.1 MHz), in Surrey, British Columbia, Canada
 Red FM (Malaysia) (104.9 MHz)
 Red FM (Greece) (96.3 MHz)